Lirobarleeia is a genus of minute sea snails, marine gastropod mollusks or micromollusks in the family Barleeiidae.

Species
Species within the genus Lirobarleeia include:
Lirobarleeia albolirata (Carpenter, 1864)
Lirobarleeia brami Faber & Moolenbeek, 2004
Lirobarleeia chiriquiensis (Olsson & McGinty, 1958)
Lirobarleeia clarionensis (Bartsch, 1911)
 Lirobarleeia deboeri (De Jong & Coomans, 1988)
Lirobarleeia elata Gofas, 1995
Lirobarleeia electrina (Carpenter, 1864)
Lirobarleeia galapagensis (Bartsch, 1911)
 Lirobarleeia gradata (d'Orbigny, 1842)
Lirobarleeia granti (Strong, 1938)
Lirobarleeia herrerae (Baker, Hanna & Strong, 1930)
Lirobarleeia hoodensis (Bartsch, 1911)
Lirobarleeia ingrami (Hertlein & Strong, 1951)
Lirobarleeia kelseyi (Dall & Bartsch, 1902)
Lirobarleeia lara (Bartsch, 1911)
 Lirobarleeia lirata (Carpenter, 1857)
Lirobarleeia nemo (Bartsch, 1911)
Lirobarleeia perlata (Mörch, 1860)
Lirobarleeia pupoides Gofas, 1995
Lirobarleeia sublaevis Gofas, 1995
Taxon inquirendum
Lirobarleeia veleronis (Hertlein & Strong, 1939)
Species brought into synonymy
Lirobarleeia nigrescens (Bartsch & Rehder, 1939): synonym of Lirobarleeia galapagensis (Bartsch, 1911)

References

 Hertz J. & Ponder W.F., 1996. Lirobarleeia Ponder, 1983 (Mollusca, Gastropoda): proposed designation of Alvania nigrescens Bartsch & Rehder, 1939 as the type species. Bulletin of Zoological Nomenclature, 53(case 2935):171-172.

 
Gastropod genera
Taxa named by Winston Ponder